Sviggum is a surname. Notable people with the surname include: 

Siw Sviggum (born 1970), Norwegian long track speed skater
Steve Sviggum (born 1951), American politician